The Solano are a people in southern part of the U.S. state of Texas and the northern portion of the  Mexican state of Coahuila. Also, the Solano language, a little-known extinct language spoken by the Solano.

See also
 Solano language

Indigenous peoples in Mexico
Ethnic groups in Mexico
Native American tribes in Texas